Professional Game Match Officials Limited (PGMOL) is the body responsible for match officials in English professional football.

Formerly known as the Professional Game Match Officials Board (PGMOB), it was formed when English referees became professional in 2001, to provide officials for all games played in the Premier League, English Football League (EFL) and Football Association (FA) competitions. The organisation is a not-for-profit company limited by guarantee owned and funded by the Premier League, EFL, and the FA.

Staff

Evaluation
The Select Group referees meet twice per month for training sessions and analysis of match videos and data.

The PGMOL have their own sports scientists, sports psychologists, physiotherapists, sprint coaches, podiatrists and vision scientists which mirror football clubs to help improve referee performance.

Every Premier League match is evaluated by a former senior referee to measure the referee's technical performance, along with fellow players and managers (match delegates) who assess accuracy and consistency of their decision making and management of their game.

Sponsorship
The PGMOL changed its sponsorship for the 2010–11 season from Air Asia to its parent group, Tune Group.

For the 2012–13 season Expedia sponsored the officials, but this agreement ended after a year.

For the start of the 2013–14 Premier League season PGMOL had no sponsor, but part way through the season EA Sports signed a long term agreement which saw their logo on the arms of all officials in the Premier League and EFL until 2019.

Controversies

Mark Halsey claim
In September 2016, Mark Halsey, a former member and referee, claimed that PGMOL asked him to lie in match reports. PGMOL denied the claim, and no further action was taken.

Employment status
In 2020, HMRC challenged the employment status of PGMOL appointed referees. The tax authority's case centred on the claim that referees should be treated as employees. However, the courts sided with PGMOL in handing down a decision that their referees are indeed self-employed.

References

Football refereeing in England
Football organisations in England
Premier League
English Football League
FA Cup
Sports organizations established in 2001